Lampenflora, also known in English as lamp-flora or lamp flora are autotrophic lifeforms present in natural or artificial caves associated with permanently installed lighting. Lampenflora are a problem with respect to the conservation of cave features, artworks, and fauna, and consequently their presence in caves can be referred to by the terms green sickness and la maladie verte.

Etymology 
The term "lampenflora" has come to English from German. It was coined by botanist Klaus Dobat in the 1960s, and just means "lamp flora".

Taxa found in lampenflora 

So far the following types of lampenflora have been described:

 cyanobacteria
 algae – Chlorophyceae, golden algae  (Chrysophyceae), diatoms  (Bacillariophyceae)
 non-vascular plants – Marchantiophyta  (Marchantiophyta), moss  (Bryophyta)
 ferns – Species of the genera Asplenium (spleenworts), Cystopteris (bladder ferns), Adiantum (maidenhair ferns), etc.
 flowering plants – alternate-leaved golden-saxifrage  (Chrysosplenium alternifolium); black elder  (Sambucus nigra)  from the moschatel  (Adoxaceae) family has been growing since in the Lurgrotte near Peggau in Styria. 
Fungi and roots growing into caves, as well as plants growing in naturally illuminated areas, are not lampenflora.

Development 

The requirements for the development of lampenflora are sufficient (artificial) light and moisture. An increase in nutrient content (e.g. fertilizer usage on land above the cave) or heat (e.g. incandescent lighting) may lead to an increase in lampenflora.
The germs, seeds or spores can get brought into the cave by air, water, animals or people.

In the aphotic (lightless) part of caves, short-term growth of photosynthetic plants is possible thanks to the seed's nutritive tissue. After this is consumed, the plant dies.

Lampenflora as a problem 

Lampenflora can cause various problems: Since lampenflora changes the appearance of show caves, it can give visitors wrong impressions of natural caves. It does not exist in caves not developed for humans. The weak acids excreted by lampenflora can also cause damage to and change limestone and other rocks. Lampenflora is especially dangerous to artifacts present in caves, such as cave paintings. The appearance of algae was one of the reasons the Lascaux cave was closed to the public. Plants can also upset cave ecology.

Reduction of lampenflora 

There are several methods for reducing lampenflora. A lot of measures involve changing lighting in caves, such as lighting which only activates when people are nearby, led lighting which produces less heat, and placing lighting further away from surfaces. Reducing red and blue light in favor of yellow light can also help, but generally makes caves less visually appealing and can make certain structures less visible. Even with special lighting certain algae species can still appear.

Lampenflora can also be periodically removed either physically or chemically. The use of phytotoxic compounds must take into account the integrity of the ecology both inside and outside the cave, and the health of visitors and cave guides.

References

External links 
 Everything you need to know about LAMPENFLORA
 The Green Slime that Flourishes in Light-Filled Caves
 Down with lampenflora
 Solutions to limit the influences of lamp-flora in tourist caves in Halong Bay

Plants
Plants and humans
Cave organisms
Artificial ecosystems
Lighting
Plants by location
Historic preservation